Emmanuel Baptist or the Main Street Baptist Church is a historic Baptist church building at 717 Main Street in Worcester, Massachusetts.  It is the only example of Norman Style architecture in the city.  The brick church was built in two parts: the chapel was built in 1853, and the main church body was built in 1855.  The elements characteristic of this particular style include recessed wall paneling, the corbelled roofline, buttresses, and the recessed entry framed by an arch.  The church was built for the Third Baptist congregation, which merged with the First Baptists in 1902, at which time the building was sold to the First Presbyterian Church of Worcester.

The building was listed on the National Register of Historic Places in 1980.

See also
National Register of Historic Places listings in southwestern Worcester, Massachusetts
National Register of Historic Places listings in Worcester County, Massachusetts

References

Baptist churches in Massachusetts
Churches on the National Register of Historic Places in Massachusetts
Churches completed in 1853
19th-century Baptist churches in the United States
Churches in Worcester, Massachusetts
National Register of Historic Places in Worcester, Massachusetts